Low-carbon power is electricity produced with substantially lower greenhouse gas emissions than conventional fossil fuel power generation. The energy transition to low-carbon power is one of the most important actions required to limit climate change. Power sector emissions may have peaked in 2018. During the first six months of 2020, scientists observed an 8.8% decrease in global CO2 emissions relative to 2019 due to COVID-19 lockdown measures. The two main sources of the decrease in emissions included ground transportation (40%) and the power sector (22%). This event is the largest absolute decrease in CO2 emissions in history, but emphasizes that low-carbon power "must be based on structural and transformational changes in energy-production systems".

Low carbon power generation sources include wind power, solar power, nuclear power and most hydropower. The term largely excludes conventional fossil fuel plant sources, and is only used to describe a particular subset of operating fossil fuel power systems, specifically, those that are successfully coupled with a flue gas carbon capture and storage (CCS) system. Globally almost 40% of electricity generation came from low-carbon sources in 2020: about 10% being  nuclear power, almost 10% wind and solar, and around 20% hydropower and other renewables.

History 

During the late 20th and early 21st century significant findings regarding global warming highlighted the need to curb carbon emissions. From this, the idea for low-carbon power was born. The Intergovernmental Panel on Climate Change (IPCC), established by the World Meteorological Organization (WMO) and the United Nations Environment Program (UNEP) in 1988, set the scientific precedence for the introduction of low-carbon power. The IPCC has continued to provide scientific, technical and socio-economic advice to the world community, through its periodic assessment reports and special reports.

Internationally, the most prominent early step in the direction of low carbon power was the signing of the Kyoto Protocol, which came into force on 16 February 2005, under which most industrialized countries committed to reduce their carbon emissions. The historical event set the political precedence for introduction of low-carbon power technology.

On a social level, perhaps the biggest factor contributing to the general public's awareness of climate change and the need for new technologies, including low carbon power, came from the documentary An Inconvenient Truth, which clarified and highlighted the problem of global warming.

Power sources by greenhouse gas emissions

Differentiating attributes of low-carbon power sources 

There are many options for lowering current levels of carbon emissions. Some options, such as wind power and solar power, produce low quantities of total life cycle carbon emissions, using entirely renewable sources. Other options, such as nuclear power, produce a comparable amount of carbon dioxide emissions as renewable technologies in total life cycle emissions, but consume non-renewable, but sustainable materials (uranium). The term low-carbon power can also include power that continues to utilize the world's natural resources, such as natural gas and coal, but only when they employ techniques that reduce carbon dioxide emissions from these sources when burning them for fuel, such as the, as of 2012, pilot plants performing Carbon capture and storage.

Because the cost of reducing emissions in the electricity sector appears to be lower than in other sectors such as transportation, the electricity sector may deliver the largest proportional carbon reductions under an economically efficient climate policy.

Technologies to produce electric power with low-carbon emissions are in use at various scales. Together, they accounted for almost 40% of global electricity in 2020, with wind and solar almost 10%.

Technologies 

The 2014 Intergovernmental Panel on Climate Change report identifies nuclear, wind, solar and hydroelectricity in suitable locations as technologies that can provide electricity with less than 5% of the lifecycle greenhouse gas emissions of coal power.

Hydroelectric power 

Hydroelectric plants have the advantage of being long-lived and many existing plants have operated for more than 100 years. Hydropower is also an extremely flexible technology from the perspective of power grid operation. Large hydropower provides one of the lowest cost options in today's energy market, even compared to fossil fuels and there are no harmful emissions associated with plant operation. However, there are typically low greenhouse gas emissions with reservoirs, and possibly high emissions in the tropics.

Hydroelectric power is the world's largest low carbon source of electricity, supplying 15.6% of total electricity in 2019. China is by far the world's largest producer of hydroelectricity in the world, followed by Brazil and Canada.

However, there are several significant social and environmental disadvantages of large-scale hydroelectric power systems: dislocation, if people are living where the reservoirs are planned, release of significant amounts of carbon dioxide and methane during construction and flooding of the reservoir, and disruption of aquatic ecosystems and birdlife. There is a strong consensus now that countries should adopt an integrated approach towards managing water resources, which would involve planning hydropower development in co-operation with other water-using sectors.

Nuclear power 

Nuclear power, with a 10.6% share of world electricity production as of 2013, is the second largest low-carbon power source.

Nuclear power, in 2010, also provided two thirds of the twenty seven nation European Union's low-carbon energy, with some EU nations sourcing a large fraction of their electricity from nuclear power; for example France derives 79% of its electricity from nuclear. As of 2020 nuclear power provided 47% low-carbon power in the EU with countries largely based on nuclear power routinely achieving carbon intensity of 30-60 gCO2eq/kWh.

According to the IAEA and the European Nuclear Society, worldwide there were 68 civil nuclear power reactors under construction in 15 countries in 2013. China has 29 of these nuclear power reactors under construction, as of 2013, with plans to build many more, while in the US the licenses of almost half its reactors have been extended to 60 years, and plans to build another dozen are under serious consideration.  There is also a considerable number of new reactors being built in South Korea, India, and Russia. 
Nuclear power's capability to add significantly to future low carbon energy growth depends on several factors, including the economics of new reactor designs, such as Generation III reactors, public opinion and national and regional politics.

The 104 U.S. nuclear plants are undergoing a Light Water Reactor Sustainability Program, to sustainably extend the life span of the U.S. nuclear fleet by a further 20 years. With further US power plants under construction in 2013, such as the two AP1000s at Vogtle Electric Generating Plant. However the Economics of new nuclear power plants are still evolving and plans to add to those plants are mostly in flux.

In 2021 United Nations Economic Commission for Europe (UNECE) described nuclear power  as important tool to mitigate climate change that has prevented 74 Gt of  emissions over the last half century, providing 20% of energy in Europe and 43% of low-carbon energy.

Wind power

Solar power 

Solar power is the conversion of sunlight into electricity, either directly using photovoltaics (PV), or indirectly using concentrated solar power (CSP). Concentrated solar power systems use lenses or mirrors and tracking systems to focus a large area of sunlight into a small beam. Photovoltaics convert light into electric current using the photoelectric effect.

Commercial concentrated solar power plants were first developed in the 1980s.  The 354 MW SEGS CSP installation is the largest solar power plant in the world, located in the Mojave Desert of California.  Other large CSP plants include the Solnova Solar Power Station (150 MW) and the Andasol solar power station (150 MW), both in Spain. The over 200 MW Agua Caliente Solar Project in the United States, and the 214 MW Charanka Solar Park in India, are the world's largest photovoltaic plants. Solar power's share of worldwide electricity usage at the end of 2014 was 1%.

Geothermal power 

Geothermal electricity is electricity generated from geothermal energy. Technologies in use include dry steam power plants, flash steam power plants and binary cycle power plants. Geothermal electricity generation is used in 24 countries while geothermal heating is in use in 70 countries.

Current worldwide installed capacity is 10,715 megawatts (MW), with the largest capacity in the United States (3,086 MW), Philippines, and Indonesia. Estimates of the electricity generating potential of geothermal energy vary from 35 to 2000 GW.

Geothermal power is considered to be sustainable because the heat extraction is small compared to the Earth's heat content.

Tidal power 
Tidal power is a form of hydropower that converts the energy of tides into electricity or other useful forms of power. The first large-scale tidal power plant (the Rance Tidal Power Station) started operation in 1966. Although not yet widely used, tidal power has potential for future electricity generation. Tides are more predictable than wind energy and solar power.

Carbon capture and storage 

Carbon capture and storage captures carbon dioxide from the flue gas of power plants or other industry, transporting it to an appropriate location where it can be buried securely in an underground reservoir. While the technologies involved are all in use, and carbon capture and storage is occurring in other industries (e.g., at the Sleipner gas field), no large scale integrated project has yet become operational within the power industry.

Improvements to current carbon capture and storage technologies could reduce CO2 capture costs by at least 20-30% over approximately the next decade, while new technologies under development promise more substantial cost reduction.

Outlook and requirements

Emissions 

The Intergovernmental Panel on Climate Change stated in its first working group report that “most of the observed increase in globally averaged temperatures since the mid-20th century is very likely due to the observed increase in anthropogenic greenhouse gas concentrations, contribute to climate change.

As a percentage of all anthropogenic greenhouse gas emissions, carbon dioxide (CO2) accounts for 72 percent (see Greenhouse gas), and has increased in concentration in the atmosphere from 315 parts per million (ppm) in 1958 to more than 375 ppm in 2005.

Emissions from energy make up more than 61.4 percent of all greenhouse gas emissions. Power generation from traditional coal fuel sources accounts for 18.8 percent of all world greenhouse gas emissions, nearly double that emitted by road transportation.

Estimates state that by 2020 the world will be producing around twice as much carbon emissions as it was in 2000.

The European Union hopes to sign a law mandating net-zero greenhouse gas emissions in the coming year for all 27 countries in the union.

Electricity usage 

Coal consumption is predicted to nearly double in that same time. The fastest growth is seen in non-OECD Asian countries, especially China and India, where economic growth drives increased energy use. By implementing low-carbon power options, world electricity demand could continue to grow while maintaining stable carbon emission levels.

In the transportation sector there are moves away from fossil fuels and towards electric vehicles, such as mass transit and the electric car. These trends are small, but may eventually add a large demand to the electrical grid.

Domestic and industrial heat and hot water have largely been supplied by burning fossil fuels such as fuel oil or natural gas at the consumers' premises. Some countries have begun heat pump rebates to encourage switching to electricity, potentially adding a large demand to the grid.

Energy infrastructure 

Coal-fired power plants are losing market share compared to low carbon power, and any built in the 2020s risk becoming stranded assets or stranded costs, partly because their capacity factors will decline.

Investment 
Investment in low-carbon power sources and technologies is increasing at a rapid rate. Zero-carbon power sources produce about 2% of the world's energy, but account for about 18% of world investment in power generation, attracting $100 billion of investment capital in 2006.

See also 
 Carbon capture and storage
 Carbon sink
 Climate Change
 Emissions trading
 Energy development
 Energy portal
 Global warming
 Greenhouse gases
 List of renewable energy organizations
 Renewable energy commercialization

References 

Sustainable energy
Energy development
Low-carbon economy